Melaleuca cordata is a plant in the myrtle family Myrtaceae, and is endemic to the south-west of  Western Australia. It is a small shrub with erect branches, heart-shaped leaves and clusters of pinkish-red to purple flowers over an extended period.

Description
They are glabrous when mature, spirally arranged around the stem with 5 to 9 veins and have a pointed end.

The flowers are deep pink to purplish-red, forming roughly spherical heads of flowers, thickly clustered on or near the ends of the stems. The flowers appear for extended periods from late spring to mid-summer.

Taxonomy and naming
Melaleuca cordata was first formally described in 1852 by the Russian botanist, Nikolai Turczaninow. The Latin specific epithet (cordata) means "cordate" or "heart-shaped", referring to the shape of the leaves.

Distribution and habitat
This melaleuca is endemic to the south-west of Western Australia from the Geraldton-Mullewa districts south to the Lake Grace-Lake King area and east to Coolgardie. It occurs in the Coolgardie, Avon Wheatbelt, Geraldton Sandplains, Mallee and Warren biogeographic regions. It grows in a range of habitats including sandy, often gravelly soils on sandplains.

Conservation status
Melaleuca cordata is listed as "not threatened" by the Government of Western Australia Department of Parks and Wildlife.

Use in horticulture
Its unusual foliage and long flowering period may make M. cordata an attractive and useful garden plant. It grows in a wide range of soils in temperate areas with low winter rainfall.

References

cordata
Myrtales of Australia
Plants described in 1852
Endemic flora of Western Australia
Taxa named by Nikolai Turczaninow